Dolores Consuelo Barcelo Gonzales  (June 6, 1907– 1994) was a Mexican–American fashion designer based in Tucson, Arizona.  She is best known for blending Native American and Mexican clothing traditions to create distinctive southwest resort wear dresses known as patio dresses, the fiesta dresses, (also known as the pejorative squaw dress).  She founded the company Dolores Resort Wear that manufactured dresses for the American market, selling in upscale department stores across the country. The iconic design was appropriated and copied by other designers throughout the southwest becoming synonymous with mid-twentieth century regionalist fashion of the American Southwest.  The dress design became the official dress of the American Square-dancing movement.

Life
Born Dolores Consuelo Barcelo in the northern Mexican state of Sonora on June 6, 1907 to Father Helberto Barcelo and Mother Beatrice Barcelo. She immigrated to Douglas, Arizona with her family in 1911 fleeing the civil unrest created by the Mexican Revolution.

She moved to Los Angeles in 1920 and began working at Phiffer's, where she assisted the designers in selecting colors, trimmings and fabrics. She worked there for 17 years,. In 1929, she married Leo Gonzales. The Gonzales family moved to Tucson in 1938. Gonzales' sister, Maria, opened her own dress shop, called Irene Page. Although Irene Page made ladies' ready-to-wear at first, Maria Gonzales began to experiment with the style of broomstick skirts.

Gonzales and her brother Richard Barcelo brought Irene Page after World War II when Maria married and moved out of state. In 1941, the store began to make their own dresses and it was also renamed the Dolores Shop. All of Gonzales's dresses were made in a converted house – factory on West Council Street.  In 1954, the Arizona Daily Star reported that Gonzales' factory created 60 dresses a day. In 1962, Barcelo convinced Gonzales to close her shop, seeing an end to the trend in fiesta dresses.

According to Dolores's Son Lee Gondolas, the store, called the Dolores Shop received orders from all over the world.  Dolores also had market outlets in Los Angeles, Chicago, St. Louis and New York. In 1956, a Los Angeles Times Reporter dubbed her "The Dior of the Desert."  Major department stores sent buyers to the Dolores Shop to purchase dresses that sold for $100 to $300 ($ to $ in  dollars). J.C. Penney wanted to sell her dressing in their stores, but Gonzales refused. Famous individuals, such as Mamie Eisenhower, Pat Nixon and Cyd Charisse were known to have bought Gonzales' dresses.

Gonzales died in July 1994 in California.

See also
 Native American fashion
 Squaw dress

References

Bibliography
 Bernice Cosulich, "American Indians Were First Designers and Tailors, Fashioning Fine Clothing." Arizona Daily Star (Tucson), March 14, 1948, p. D1
 Dolores Resort Wear, Dior of the Desert, Tucson Modernism Week, October 2015

Further reading
 Squaw Dress Industry, Vol. 51 No. 4 (winter 2010) pp 299–320.  Arizona Historical Society.

1907 births
1994 deaths
20th-century Mexican artists
Artists from New York (state)
American fashion designers
American women fashion designers
Mexican fashion designers
Mexican women fashion designers
Artists from Tucson, Arizona
20th-century American women artists
20th-century American artists
Mexican emigrants to the United States